Kavindu Silva (born 12 September 1993) is a Sri Lankan cricketer. He made his Twenty20 debut on 5 March 2021, for Police Sports Club in the 2020–21 SLC Twenty20 Tournament.

References

External links
 

1993 births
Living people
Sri Lankan cricketers
Sri Lanka Police Sports Club cricketers
Place of birth missing (living people)